2014 Commonwealth of Independent States Cup was the 22nd annual Commonwealth of Independent States Cup since its establishment in 1993. It was hosted in Saint Petersburg, Russia between 24 January and 2 February 2014.

Saint Petersburg hosted the event for the fifth time, with all matches being held in a single venue (Saint Petersburg Sports and Concert Complex). All participating nations were represented by their youth (U20/U21) national teams.

Format
Group stage
Twelve teams were divided into three groups of four. The top two of each group qualified automatically for a play-off along with the two best third placed teams. The other third placed team along with the three bottom participants out of each group proceed to the play-off which would place its participants 9th through 12th places.

Playoffs
The winners of the quarter finals advanced further into semi-finals, while the other four less fortunate entered play-off for the fifth place. Next the winners of the semi-finals advanced to the final, while the other two participants played for the third place. Simultaneously the winners of the play-off for the fifth place continued to the fifth place match, while the other two played for the seventh place.

Participants
The following 12 teams, shown with age of youth national team, took part in the tournament:

Squads

Group stage

Group A

Results
All subsequent times UTC+3

Group B

Results
All subsequent times UTC+3

Group C

Results
All subsequent times UTC+3

Consolation round

Bracket

Places 9 to 12

Eleventh place match

Ninth place match

Final stages

Bracket

Quarter-finals

Places 5 to 8

Semi-finals

Seventh place match

Fifth place match

Third place match

Final

Final standing

Top scorers

References

External links 
 
 Russian Football Union Official web-site 

2013–14 in Russian football
2013–14 in Ukrainian football
2014 in Saint Petersburg
2014
January 2014 sports events in Russia
February 2014 sports events in Russia